Mzuvukile Matomela (born 28 April 1980) is a South African former cricketer. He played in one first-class and one List A match for Border in 2000/01.

See also
 List of Border representative cricketers

References

External links
 

1980 births
Living people
South African cricketers
Border cricketers
People from Mdantsane
Cricketers from the Eastern Cape